Paspalidium basicladum is a species of grass in the family Poaceae native to Australia, first described by Dorothy Kate Hughes in 1923. It is an annual and is found in desert and dry shrublands. Australian authorities accept the name as Paspalidium basicladum, but other authorities consider the accepted name to be Setaria basiclada.

References

Panicoideae
Plants described in 1923
Flora of Western Australia
Flora of South Australia
Flora of the Northern Territory